There were ten diving events at the 2010 South American Games. The events were held over March 20–23.

Medal summary

Medal table

Medalists

 
Diving
South American Games
2010